Jed Lance Stugart (born March 4, 1970) is an American football coach and former player. He is currently the head football coach at Lindenwood University in St. Charles, Missouri, a position he assumed after the 2016 season. Prior to that, he spent seven seasons as the head football coach at the University of Sioux Falls (2010–2016) and three years in the same position at MidAmerica Nazarene University (2006–2008).

A native of Greeley, Colorado, Stugart played college football as a linebacker at Azusa Pacific University. During the 1990s he pursued a country music career in Nashville, Tennessee. Performing as Jed Lance, he opened for Lonestar, the Nitty Gritty Dirt Band, and Tim McGraw.  Stugart returned to Greeley in the late 1990s and volunteered as a high school football coach. Joe Glenn, then head football coach at the University of Northern Colorado, hired Stugart to join his staff as a volunteer. Stugart later became a graduate assistant at Northern Colorado before being promoted to defensive coordinator in 2003.

Head coaching record

References

External links
 Lindenwood profile

1970 births
Living people
American football linebackers
Azusa Pacific Cougars football players
Lindenwood Lions football coaches
MidAmerica Nazarene Pioneers football coaches
Northern Colorado Bears football coaches
Sioux Falls Cougars football coaches
UNLV Rebels football coaches
High school football coaches in Colorado
University of Northern Colorado alumni
People from Greeley, Colorado
Coaches of American football from Colorado
Players of American football from Colorado